The Australian Rules Football League of Ireland (ARFLI) is an Australian rules football competition and is the governing body of Australian Football in Ireland. Ireland is ranked the number three country in Australian football outside of Australia despite having a smaller league than some of its  lower-ranked competitors.
Ireland has been a competitor and finalist in all AFL International Cups and a winner twice. The success of the Irish team has commonly been attributed to the ease at which Gaelic footballers adapt to the Australian football because of certain similarities between the two codes.

The league is an international affiliate of the Australian Football League and a founding member of the European governing body, AFL Europe. The league is not affiliated with the Gaelic Athletic Association or the International Rules Series.

History

The ARFLI was formed in October 2000 after the first ever Irish Grand Final was contested between Dublin Demons and Belfast Redbacks. Aussie Rules had arrived in Ireland almost exactly a year previously when Australian Football clubs were simultaneously formed in Dublin and Belfast. The two clubs recruited and trained through the winter and played a number of British clubs in challenge matches in early spring.

The Demons then travelled to London in April 2000, where they took part in the FSS Cup - BARFL’s (British Australian Rules Football League) pre-season competition. The Dublin lads finished third out of twelve teams in their first real competitive games and people sat up and took notice that Aussie Rules had arrived in the Emerald Isle. The Demons and Redbacks then played out a best of three series that culminated in the previously mentioned Grand Final with the Demons being crowned Irelands first Aussie Rules Champions.

After this game, Michael Currane (originally from Kilmihil in West Clare), ARFLI Chief Executive Officer, and Ciaran O hEeadhra from the Gaeilteacht area of Mayo, who had both been actively involved with the Dublin club from the start, decided that it was time to take the sport of Aussie Rules on a step in Ireland, and working in close collaboration with the existing clubs in Dublin and Belfast, set up the Australian Rules Football League of Ireland. They wanted to see the game develop and saw a potential for the sport to be a success due to the similarities with Gaelic football.

ARFLI spent the following few months promoting the game and encouraging and assisting with the formation of new clubs. The Leeside Lions (based in Cork City) were the next team to be formed. The Lions had quite a debut year with the club contesting both domestic finals that season. The Lions were quickly followed by the Drogheda Dockers (founded by Justin Stubbs - an Aussie based in the County Louth town) and the Midland Tigers (based in Mullingar and founded by Paul Ryan, an Aussie expat and local man Tom Leavy). ARFLI had grown to a five-club organisation in as many months. The founding clubs of ARFLI are the Belfast Redbacks, Dublin Demons, Leeside Lions, Drogheda Dockers and Midland Tigers.

From the early days, ARFLI’s co-founders Currane and O ‘Headhra were also heavily involved with developing relations with other leagues and promoting the sport internationally. Even though Aussie Rules had been played in many countries worldwide, for upwards of ten/fifteen years there was a lack of organised international interaction. In response to this, Michael founded the EARFC (European Australian Rules Football Council) in January 2001, with a view to developing the sport of Aussie Rules across the continent and strengthening ties between the already established leagues.

The EARFC was immediately ratified and joined by the other European leagues. Michael and Ciaran have sat on the council from the beginning. The EARFC is currently liaising with existing footy leagues/clubs in the following nations: Great Britain, Ireland, Denmark, Sweden, France, Germany, Greece, Turkey and Poland. As a founding member of the Atlantic Alliance (formerly the NHAFF) Michael was elected onto the five man Atlantic Alliance Committee as the ARFLI representative, along with representatives from Canada, USA, Denmark and Great Britain. The Atlantic Alliance is an international umbrella group for the sport of Australian Rules Football in the Northern Hemisphere.

In Domestic games in 2001, ARFLI had two major competitions - the ARFLI Super 9’s and the ARFLI Premiership. The ARFLI Super 9’s was a nine a side competition played on regular Gaelic football pitches. It was designed to help the new clubs adapt to Aussie Rules, gain some experience and allow for maximum participation for all players. The use of the GAA pitches also made it easier on the clubs in that it is extremely difficult to find space to have a full size Aussie rules oval. The competition saw two of the new teams, the Leeside Lions and the Midland Tigers, making it through to the final which was played at O Rathailligh Park (Louth’s county GAA Grounds) in Drogheda towards the end of May. This game was ultimately won by the Tigers.

The ARFLI Premiership commenced on 16 June and was a 14 a side competition played on a home and away basis. After a very close competition, the final took place in September in James Park, Kilkenny and was contested between the Dublin Demons and the Leeside Lions. ARFLI brought the final to Kilkenny as part their efforts to spread the game and as a result there is now a team being formed in the marble city – the Kilkenny Bulldogs. The Demons went on to win their second flag in a row and the ARFLI Premiership Cup 2001.

The first ever Fosters Aussie Rules Australia Day Challenge Cup took place on 26 January in Ennis as part of a big Australia Day celebration. The Leeside Lions contested the game against the Dublin Demons with the Cork-based side deservedly winning their first piece of silverware in a very close game. The first ever “Outonthetown.ie” Auscamp took place earlier on the same day in Ennis where ARFLI introduced their Auskick program to local children.

The Leeside Lions made ARFLI history in 2016, completing a first ever unbeaten championship after winning all nine games of the Home and Away Season and the Grand Final. This was a feat repeated by the Belfast Redbacks in 2018.

Premiership winners

2021 clubs

Men's clubs
 South Dublin Swans
 Leeside Lions
 Galway Magpies
 Belfast Redbacks

Women's clubs
 Dublin Swans
 Ulster Kookaburras
 Cork Vikings

2022 clubs

Men's Clubs
 South Dublin Swans
 Leeside Lions
 Galway Magpies
 Belfast Redbacks

Women's Clubs
 Dublin Black Swans
 Cork Vikings
 Ulster Kookaburras
 Galway Magpies

Former clubs
 Drogheda Dockers
 Dublin Eagles (renamed South Dublin Swans in 2006)
 Galway Tribesmen
 Midwest Magpies (renamed Galway Magpies in 2012)
 Clare Crows
 Midland Tigers
 Dublin Saints
 Dublin Demons
 North Leinster Giants

(Note:: Midland Tigers and Saints merged during the 2011 Season under the name Kangaroos. For the 2012 Season following an affiliation with Greater Western Sydney, the Kangaroos became the North Leinster Giants.)

See also

List of Australian rules football leagues outside Australia

References

External links

Australian rules football competitions in Europe
Australian rules football in Ireland
Australian rules football governing bodies outside Australia
Australian Football
Sports leagues established in 2000
Australian Rules Football